Oksana Yakovyshyn is a Ukrainian football striker, currently playing for Mordovochka Saransk in the Russian Championship. She previously played for Lehenda Chernihiv and Rossiyanka.

She is a member of the Ukrainian national team. She made her debut in the 2009 European Championship, where she replaced injured Svitlana Vanyushkina.

References

1993 births
Living people
Ukrainian women's footballers
WFC Lehenda-ShVSM Chernihiv players
WFC Naftokhimik Kalush players
Expatriate women's footballers in Russia
WFC Rossiyanka players
Ukraine women's international footballers
Women's association football forwards
Ukrainian expatriate sportspeople in Russia
Sportspeople from Ivano-Frankivsk Oblast